Ivan Brnić (born 23 August 2001) is a Croatian footballer who plays as a winger for Slovenian PrvaLiga side Maribor.

Career
Brnić spent his youth career in the Hajduk Split academy. He made his senior debut for Hajduk in June 2020 in a match against Inter Zaprešić.

Career statistics

Club

References

2001 births
Living people
Footballers from Split, Croatia
Croatian footballers
Croatia youth international footballers
Association football wingers
First Football League (Croatia) players
Croatian Football League players
Slovenian PrvaLiga players
HNK Hajduk Split players
NK Dugopolje players
NK Maribor players
Croatian expatriate footballers
Croatian expatriate sportspeople in Slovenia
Expatriate footballers in Slovenia